Quintessence: The Quality of Having It is a book by Betty Cornfeld and Owen Edwards, originally published in 1983 and reissued in 2001.

In 1983 it was recommended by The New York Times as a potential Christmas present.

References

American non-fiction books
1983 non-fiction books